Soviet submarine K-22 was a K-class submarine of the Soviet Navy during World War II. She was part of the Northern Fleet until her loss in 1943.

Operational history 
Operating against Axis shipping in Norwegian waters, K-22 focused on gunnery attacks with her artillery.

On 9 April 1942 she discovered the damaged submarine ShCh-421, which had been disabled by a mine. Her crew had sailed her out of a minefield using a crude sail built from a canvas cover. K-23 rescued ShCh-421s crew and then scuttled the disabled submarine with a torpedo.

On 7 February 1943, K-22 was sunk with all hands by an enemy mine. She had just previously been in contact with her base.

References 

1938 ships
Ships built in the Soviet Union
Soviet K-class submarines
World War II submarines of the Soviet Union
Ships sunk by mines